Atharva is a 2018 Indian Kannada-language action drama film written and directed by Arun. The film stars Pavan Teja and Sanam Shetty in the lead roles. It was released on 13 July 2018.

Cast 
 Pavan Teja as Nanda
 Sanam Shetty as Rachita
 Yashwanth Shetty as Maari Mahadeva
 Rangayana Raghu
 Tara

Production 
Director Arun had written the story in 2013 and approached producer Vinay Kumar and co-producer Rakshay to support the project. Pavan Teja, a nephew of an actor Arjun Sarja, was cast in the lead role to make his acting debut. Prior to working on the film, he had acted in theatre shows, and readied himself to play three different avatars in the film by losing 15 kilograms. Sanam Shetty, who had appeared in other regional South Indian films, made her first appearance in a Kannada-language project through Atharva. The film was shot for 65 days starting in October 2017 in areas including Bengaluru, Mangaluru, Chickmagaluru, Mandya, and Kanakapura.

Release and reception 
The film released on 13 July 2018. A critic from The Times of India noted, "Arun has used the tried-and-tested, love-and-action formula without strong content", giving the film a mixed review. A reviewer from Chitratara.com noted "for the arrival of new hero Pawan Teja and some delectable scenes, this film is worth watching".

References

External links 

 

2010s Kannada-language films
2018 films
Indian action drama films
2018 romance films